E3 SUMO-protein ligase PIAS4 is one of several protein inhibitor of activated STAT (PIAS) proteins. It is also known as protein inhibitor of activated STAT protein gamma (PIASg or PIASy), and is an enzyme that in humans is encoded by the PIAS4 gene.

Interactions
PIAS4 has been shown to interact with Mothers against decapentaplegic homolog 6, Mothers against decapentaplegic homolog 7 and Lymphoid enhancer-binding factor 1.

References

Further reading